Alpi Eagles SpA was an airline headquartered in Sant'Angelo di Piove di Sacco, Italy. The privately owned regional airline operated scheduled passenger services, linking 15 domestic destinations, as well as international services to Albania, Czech Republic, France, Romania, Russia, Spain and Ukraine. Its main base was Marco Polo International Airport, Venice.

History 
A majority of the shares were purchased by Paolo Sinigalia, owner of the Simod shoe factory, in Padova, Italy.

One of the company's decisions was to "cut" the scheduled block times (scheduled time from engine start to engine shut down), because pilots were paid based on their block time. Flights were delayed; management then decided to cut scheduled turnover times. Maintenance was unable to repair airplanes on time, resulting in flight delays. Four-hour delays became routine at the Venice and Naples airports. Passengers slowly reverted to Air One Cityliner, despite preferring to fly AlpiEagles airplanes for comfort.

Pilots started to leave the company; more flights were delayed or canceled due to lack of personnel, crew rest periods, and other reasons. More passengers turned to Air One Cityliner.

In September 2007, the Italian Civil Aviation Authority (ENAC) informed passengers that Alpi Eagles's license was under investigation, due to insufficient financial resources. Their license to operate was suspended by the Italian authorities in October 2007. After legal action, a provisional license was issued by ENAC, valid until 31 December 2007. However, in December 2007, Alpi Eagles was forbidden to operate by ENAC, effective 1 January 2008.

Fleet 

At the time of the company's suspension of its operating license, on December 31, 2007, Alpi Eagles's fleet consisted of eight Fokker 100; a ninth had been withdrawn from use in November 2007.

From September 2002, through January 2003, Alpi Eagles operated two Boeing 737-700, which had been leased from Danish airline Maersk Air.

Two of Alpi Eagles's Fokker aircraft had been wetleased to Air Dolomiti from May 1999, until December 1999, in the full Air Dolomiti colour scheme. One of those aircraft was involved in an incident at Barcelona's El Prat Airport (Spain) on November 7, 1999, when half of the main landing gear failed to lock, and collapsed during landing (see Air Dolomiti Accidents and incidents).

Services 
Alpi Eagles suspended all flights starting January 3, 2008. It operated flights to the following cities as of October 2006: 

Domestic scheduled destinations: Alghero, Bari, Bergamo, Bologna, Brindisi, Cagliari, Catania, Lamezia Terme, Milan, Naples, Olbia, Palermo, Reggio Calabria, Trieste, Verona and Venice.
International scheduled destinations: Athens, Barcelona, Bucharest, Cluj Napoca, Kyiv, Moscow, Nice, Odessa, Prague, Pristina, Timișoara, Tirana and Valencia.

References

External links

Alpi Eagles
  (Archive)
Alpi Eagles fleet
  Letter by AlpiEgleas to clients 15 nov 2007

Italian companies established in 1979
Defunct airlines of Italy
Airlines established in 1979
Airlines disestablished in 2007
Italian companies disestablished in 2007